Tevester Anderson (born February 25, 1937) is a retired American college basketball coach and former men's basketball head coach at Jackson State University and Murray State University. He is a native of Canton, Mississippi.

Anderson earned his bachelor's degree in pre-medicine from Arkansas AM&N University (now University of Arkansas at Pine Bluff) in 1962 and, in 1971, earned his master's degree in biological science from North Carolina A&T State University. He began his coaching career at Canton High School, where he served as head basketball coach; he also taught biology.

Head coaching record

References

External links
Jackson State bio

1937 births
Living people
Basketball coaches from Mississippi
Auburn Tigers men's basketball coaches
Georgia Bulldogs basketball coaches
College men's basketball head coaches in the United States
High school basketball coaches in Georgia (U.S. state)
Jackson State Tigers basketball coaches
Murray State Racers men's basketball coaches
North Carolina A&T State University alumni
People from Canton, Mississippi
University of Arkansas at Pine Bluff alumni
Place of birth missing (living people)